City Hall Eastmay mean:
City Hall East in Atlanta, now Ponce City Market
City Hall East in Los Angeles', part of the Los Angeles Mall